The Kamennye Islands or Kammenny Islands (Kamennye Ostrova) is a group of islands in the Kara Sea, Russian Federation.

Geography
The islands lie off the coast of Siberia, west of the mouths of river Pyasina. They are covered with tundra vegetation. 

The sea surrounding the Kamennye Islands is covered with pack ice with some polynias in the winter and there are many ice floes even in the summer, so that they are connected with the Siberian mainland during the long winters. The climate is severe and summers last only about two months.

This island group belongs to the Krasnoyarsk Krai administrative division of the Russian Federation.

Islands
The main islands are (from East to West):

Morzhovo Island, with a diameter of only , is the closest to land.
Rastorguyev Island. It is occasionally confused with Kolchak Island (which is located further east in the Kara Sea along the coast south of the Nordenskiold Archipelago, and until 2005, used to also be known as Rastorguyev Island).
Zapadny Kamenny Island, roughly circular in shape;  in diameter.

History
These islands were explored by Russian geologist Baron Eduard Von Toll during an expedition on behalf of the Imperial Russian Academy of Sciences.

They island group is included in the Great Arctic State Nature Reserve of the Russian Arctic.

See also
List of islands of Russia

References

Archipelagoes of the Kara Sea
Archipelagoes of Krasnoyarsk Krai